Heteropogon triticeus  is a tropical, perennial tussock grass with a native distribution encompassing Tropical and Temperate  Asia, Malesia and Northern and Eastern Australia. The plants develop characteristic dark seeds with a single long awn at one end and a sharp spike at the other. The awn becomes twisted when dry and straightens when moistened, and in combination with the spike is capable of drilling the seed into the soil.

The species is known as giant spear grass, and is closely related to the more common black spear grass, with which it is commonly associated in Northern Australia.

Uses

References

 Nativeseeds.com.au: Heteropogon triticeus 

Panicoideae
Bunchgrasses of Asia
Poales of Australia
Flora of Queensland
Forages
Taxa named by William Grant Craib